Shobhit University is a private university located in Gangoh, Saharanpur district, Uttar Pradesh, India. It was established in July 2012 under the Shobhit Vishwavidhaylaya, Uttar Pradesh Adhiniyam, 2011.

History
Shobhit University began its way in July 2000, with the establishment of Shobhit Institute of Engineering and Technology (SIET) by the NICE Society, which was itself established in July 1989. The institute included two engineering colleges, at Gangoh and Meerut, the latter better known as Shobhit Institute of Engineering and Technology, Saharanpur. The college was affiliated to Uttar Pradesh Technical University and later to Gautam Buddh Technical University, both now Dr. A.P.J. Abdul Kalam Technical University.

In July 2006 the NICE Society established the Adarsh Vijendra Institute of Pharmaceutical Sciences (AVIPS), now a constituent college of the university. In November 2006 the Meerut college received deemed to be university status, and became popularly known as Shobhit University, Meerut, officially Shobhit Institute of Engineering and Technology.

In July 2012 the Gangoh college became a university under the Shobhit Vishwavidhaylaya, Uttar Pradesh Adhiniyam, 2011. The School of Law and Constitutional Studies (SLCS) was established in July 2013, followed by the Kunwar Shekhar Vijendra Ayurved Medical College and Research Centre in July 2014, the School of Education in July 2015 and the Kunwar Shekhar Vijendra Medical College of Naturopathy and Yogic Sciences in January 2016.

Academics
The university offers graduate, postgraduate and professional degrees through the following schools and departments:
 School of Engineering & Technology
 School of Biological Engineering & Sciences
 Department of Computer Science & Applications
 School of Business Studies
 School of Ayurveda
 School of Pharmacy
 School of Law & Constitutional
 School of Naturopathy & Yogic Sciences
 School of Education
 School of Basic & Applied Sciences
 School of Agriculture & Environmental Sciences

Accreditation 
Like all universities in India, Shobhit University is approved by the University Grants Commission (UGC). The education programmes are recognised by the National Council for Teacher Education (NCTE).

References

External links

Saharanpur district
Educational institutions established in 2012
2012 establishments in Uttar Pradesh
Private universities in Uttar Pradesh